Xu Hongxing (born May 1969) is a Chinese physicist and vice president of the Institute for Advanced Studies of Wuhan University. He is also a professor at the School of Physics and Technology, Wuhan University.

Biography
Xu was born in Lianyungang, Jiangsu province in 1969. After graduating from Banpu High School in 1988, he was accepted to Peking University. In 1996, he pursued advanced studies in Sweden, earning his master's degree and doctor's degree from Chalmers University of Technology in 1998 and 2002, respectively.

In August 2002, he was promoted to associate professor at Chalmers University of Technology. He returned to China in January 2005 and that year became a researcher at the Institute of Physics, Chinese Academy of Sciences (CAS). He was deputy director of the State Key Laboratory for Surface Physics from 2007 to 2008 and director of  Nanoscale Physics & Devices Laboratory from 2009 to 2014. He joined the Communist Party of China in May 2011. In September 2012, he joined Wuhan University as professor and director of Center for Nanoscience and Technology. He was appointed as a "Chang Jiang Scholar" (or " Yangtze River Scholar") by the Ministry of Education of the People's Republic of China in 2014.

Honour
In November 2017 he was elected an academician of the Chinese Academy of Sciences (CAS).

In 2018 he became a member of the Chinese Optical Society. That same year, he was elected a fellow of The World Academy of Sciences.

References

External links
 Xu Hongxing on Institute of Physics, Chinese Academy of Sciences (CAS)

1969 births
People from Lianyungang
Living people
Peking University alumni
Chalmers University of Technology alumni
Academic staff of the Chalmers University of Technology
Members of the Chinese Academy of Sciences
TWAS fellows
Academic staff of Wuhan University
Physicists from Jiangsu